Parliamentary elections were held in Hungary between 29 January and 3 February 1892. The result was a victory for the Liberal Party, which won 243 of the 413 seats.

Results

Parliamentary
Hungary
Elections in Hungary
Elections in Austria-Hungary
Hungary
Hungary

hu:Magyarországi országgyűlési választások a dualizmus korában#1892